In computing, ls is a command to list computer files and directories in Unix and Unix-like operating systems. It is specified by POSIX and the Single UNIX Specification.
 
It is available in the EFI shell, as a separate package for Microsoft Windows as part of the UnxUtils collection of native Win32 ports of common GNU Unix-like utilities,
or as part of ASCII's MSX-DOS2 Tools for MSX-DOS version 2.

The numerical computing environments MATLAB and GNU Octave include an ls 
function with similar functionality.

In other environments, such as DOS, OS/2, and Microsoft Windows, similar functionality is provided by the dir command.

As with most utilities the different implementations have different options. Check the documentation provided with the command for correct usage and options.

History 
An ls utility appeared in the first version of AT&T UNIX, the name inherited from a similar command in Multics also named 'ls', short for the word "list".  is part of the X/Open Portability Guide since issue 2 of 1987. It was inherited into the first version of POSIX.1 and the Single Unix Specification.

Command syntax
ls [options] [file… | directory …]

Behavior 
Unix and Unix-like operating systems maintain the idea of a working directory. When invoked without arguments, ls lists the files in the working directory. If a directory is specified, the files in that directory are listed. The arguments may contain a multiple files and directories.

Names starting with "." are hidden. The directory "." refers to the working directory and ".." refers to its parent directory. These are not shown by default. With -a (all) hidden files are shown. Using -A (All including "." and ".." ).  File names specified explicitly (for example ".secret*" ) are always listed.

Without options, ls displays names only. Multiple options may be combined.
Common options include:
 -l long format, displaying Unix file types, permissions, number of hard links, owner, group, size, last-modified date-time and name. If the modified date is older than 6 months the time is replaced with the year. Some implementations add additional flags to permissions.
 -h output sizes in human readable format. (e.g., 1K, 234M, 2G, etc.) This option is not part of the POSIX standard, although implemented in several systems, e.g., GNU coreutils in 1997, FreeBSD 4.5 in 2002, and Solaris 9 in 2002.

Additional options controlling how items are displayed include:
 -R Recursively list items in subdirectories and subdirectories …
 -t sort the list by modification time. (default is alphabetically)
 -u sort the list by last access time.
 -c sort the list by last attribute (status) change time.
 -r reverse the order, for example most recent time last.
 --full-time to show times with seconds and milliseconds instead of down to the minute.
 -1 one entry per line.
 -m Stream format; list items across the page, separated by commas.
 -g include group but not owner
 -o include owner but not group (when combined with -g both group and owner are suppressed)
 -d shows information about a directory or symbolic link, rather than the contents of a directory or the link's target.
 -F append a "/" to directory names and a "*" to executable files.
It is may be possible to highlight different types of items with different colors. This is an area where implementations differ:

 GNU ls uses the --color option; it checks the Unix file type, the file permissions and the file extension and uses its own database to control colors maintained using dircolors.
 FreeBSD ls uses the -G option; it checks only the Unix file type and file permissions and uses the termcap database
When the option to use color to indicate item types is selected, the output might look like:
-rw-r--r--    1 tsmitt nregion   26650 Dec 20 11:16 audio.ogg
brw-r--r--    1 tsmitt nregion      64 Jan 27 05:52 bd-block-device
crw-r--r--    1 tsmitt nregion     255 Jan 26 13:57 cd-character-device
-rw-r--r--    1 tsmitt nregion     290 Jan 26 14:08 image.png
drwxrwxr-x    2 tsmitt nregion      48 Jan 26 11:28 di-directory
-rwxrwxr-x    1 tsmitt nregion      29 Jan 26 14:03 ex-executable
-rw-r--r--    1 tsmitt nregion       0 Dec 20 09:39 fi-regular-file
lrwxrwxrwx    1 tsmitt nregion       3 Jan 26 11:44 ln-soft-link -> dir
lrwxrwxrwx    1 tsmitt nregion      15 Dec 20 10:57 or-orphan-link -> mi-missing-link
drwxr-xrwx    2 tsmitt nregion    4096 Dec 20 10:58 ow-other-writeable-dir
prw-r--r--    1 tsmitt nregion       0 Jan 26 11:50 pi-pipe
-rwxr-sr-x    1 tsmitt nregion       0 Dec 20 11:05 sg-setgid
srw-rw-rw-    1 tsmitt nregion       0 Jan 26 12:00 so-socket
drwxr-xr-t    2 tsmitt nregion    4096 Dec 20 10:58 st-sticky-dir
-rwsr-xr-x    1 tsmitt nregion       0 Dec 20 11:09 su-setuid
-rw-r--r--    1 tsmitt nregion   10240 Dec 20 11:12 compressed.gz
drwxrwxrwt    2 tsmitt nregion    4096 Dec 20 11:10 tw-sticky-other-writeable-dir

Sample usage 
The following example demonstrates the output of the command:
$ ls -l
drwxr--r--   1 fjones editors     4096 Mar  2 12:52  drafts
-rw-r--r--   3 fjones editors    30405 Mar  2 12:52  edition-32
-r-xr-xr-x   1 fjones bookkeepers 8460 Jan 16  2022  edit.sh
The above example shows the "d" (directory) or "-" (file) indicator, Unix file permission notation, number of hard links (1 or 3). In the working directory the owner fjones has a directory named drafts, a regular file named edition-32, and an old executable named edit.sh.

See also 
 stat (Unix)
 chown
 chgrp
 du (Unix)
 mdls
 User identifier (Unix)
 Group identifier (Unix)
 List of Unix commands
 Unix directory structure

References

External links 

 
 
 
 
 
 
 
 
 GNU ls source code (as part of coreutils)
 ls at the LinuxQuestions.org wiki

Multics commands
Standard Unix programs
Unix SUS2008 utilities
Plan 9 commands
Inferno (operating system) commands
IBM i Qshell commands